The Young Democrats (JD) is a social-liberal youth organisation in the Netherlands, founded in 1984. Although independent, it is affiliated with the social-liberal Democrats 66 party. With over 5,000 members, it is the largest political youth organisation of the Netherlands.

Principles
According to its Declaration of Principles, the Young Democrats are a liberal-democratic youth organisation. Its main objective is to contribute to the individual development of every person. Core values of the Young Democrats are liberty, equality, solidarity, sustainability and pragmatism. The JD is also in favour of the radical democratisation of society.

Policies
 The Young Democrats advocate preparing the Netherlands for the consequences of an ageing society. They suggest increasing labour participation by reforming social security. JD is in favour of gradually raising the retirement age to 67 years from the current age of 65.

 The Young Democrats are in favour of ending the right of faith-based schools to refuse enrolment by pupils on the basis of religion.
 The Young Democrats are supporters of gradually phasing out tax breaks for home owners paying interest on a mortgage.
 The Young Democrats are staunch defenders of civil liberties. They continue to support liberal reforms attained by D66 in the past in eras such as euthanasia, gay marriage, abortion and the legalisation of prostitution. The JD also wishes to see the production of softdrugs legalised.
 The Young Democrats oppose counter-terrorism measures that are neither proportional nor have proven effective. In particular, JD opposes current legislation obliging citizens to be able to prove their identity at any time. JD rejects a ban on the wearing of the burqa in public spaces.
 The Young Democrats are in favour of more direct democracy in the form of referendums and direct elections for the offices of Prime Minister and mayor.
 The Young Democrats are in favour of more investment in renewable energy sources and fully support the Kyoto Protocol. The JD is not opposed to nuclear energy, as it contributes to cutting greenhouse gas emissions.
 The Young Democrats are European federalists and wish to see more European cooperation on immigration, defence and foreign policy.
 The Young Democrats are strong supporters of international law and human rights.

Organisation
Within the Young Democrats power lies with the members. The Congress is the sovereign body of the Young Democrats and meets three times a year. During the Congress members of the National Board are elected individually and JD policy is decided through resolutions, amendments and motions. All members have equal say through the one man, one vote system.

National Board
The day-to-day management of the Young Democrats is in the hands of the National Board, the members of which are:
 President: Joris Hetterscheid
 Secretary-General: Hester van Wessel
 Treasurer: Bart Kessels
 Political Officer: Lars Gerrits
 Marketing Officer: Eswara de Mol
 External Affairs Officer: Gijs Toussaint
 Organisation Officer: Tom Urbaschek
 Internal Affairs Officer: Silke Kok

Local branches
Currently the Young Democrats have ten local branches, most of which are based in university cities, such as Amsterdam, Utrecht, Rotterdam and Leiden. Every branch has a local board and organises regular general meetings where local board members are elected and policy is decided. Every local member has the right to vote at the local general meetings.
The sections are:
Amsterdam, for the province of North Holland and the city of Almere
Leiden-Haaglanden, for Leiden, The Hague and Delft
Rotterdam, for the southern part of the province of South Holland
Brabant, for the provinces of North Brabant and Zeeland
Arnhem-Nijmegen, for the cities of Arnhem and Nijmegen
Utrecht, for Utrecht and Wageningen
Groningen, for the provinces of Groningen and Drenthe
Friesland
Wageningen

International ties
The Young Democrats of the Netherlands, together with the Youth Organisation Freedom and Democracy (JOVD), are members of both the European Liberal Youth (LYMEC) and the International Federation of Liberal Youth (IFLRY).
Young Democrat Bart Woord was the president of the IFLRY Bureau from November 2009 to November 2010.
Currently, from November 2010, Ivo Thijssen is the representative of the LYMEC Bureau in the IFLRY Bureau.
Furthermore, there exist close bilateral ties with the German, Belgian, British and Tunisian young liberals.

References

External links
 Young Democrats website
 Democrats 66 website (in English)
 European Liberal Youth website
 International Federation of Liberal Youth website

Youth wings of political parties in the Netherlands
Youth wings of liberal parties
Democrats 66
1984 establishments in the Netherlands
Youth organizations established in 1984
Organisations based in The Hague